Andreas Thiel (born March 3, 1960) is a former German handball player who competed in the 1984 Summer Olympics, in the 1992 Summer Olympics and in the 1996 Summer Olympics.

In 1984 he was a member of the West German handball team which won the silver medal. He played all six matches as goalkeeper.

Eight years later he was part of the German team which finished tenth. He played five matches as goalkeeper.

In 1996 he played all six matches as goalkeeper for the German team again.

References 
 
 

1960 births
Living people
People from Lünen
Sportspeople from Arnsberg (region)
German male handball players
Handball players at the 1984 Summer Olympics
Handball players at the 1992 Summer Olympics
Handball players at the 1996 Summer Olympics
Olympic handball players of West Germany
Olympic handball players of Germany
Olympic silver medalists for West Germany
Olympic medalists in handball
Medalists at the 1984 Summer Olympics